The men's pole vault event at the 2009 Summer Universiade was held on 9–11 July.

Medalists

Results

Qualification
Qualification: 5.30 m (Q) or at least 12 best (q) qualified for the final.

Final

References
Results (archived)

Pole
2009